General elections were held in Fiji on 28 April 1911.

Electoral system
The Legislative Council consisted of eleven civil servants, six elected Europeans and two appointed Fijians. Previously the six Europeans had been elected from three constituencies; Levuka (one seat), Suva (two seats) and a "Planters" constituency covering the rest of the colony (three seats). However, prior to the 1911 elections, the Planters constituency was split into three single-member constituencies; Eastern, Northern and Southern.

Results

Appointed members
The nominated members were appointed on 3 June.

References

1911 elections in Oceania
1911 in Fiji
1911
1911 elections in the British Empire